Harlosh Island is one of four islands to be found in Skye's Loch Bracadale.

The coastline, which is largely cliff-lined, has a cave on the west coast.

Harlosh Skerry lies just offshore to the north west, upon which seals can be seen frequently. At low tide on the northern coast there is a large sandy bay, however, watercraft should take caution when attempting to land in the bay as several rock formations pose a navigational hazard at low tide.

The name "Harlosh" is of Old Norse origin and may refer to a river mouth, although the meaning is not clear.

Notes

External links

Uninhabited islands of Highland (council area)